Equipo Continental Municipalidad de Pocito is an Argentinian UCI Continental cycling team founded in 2010.

Team roster

Major results
2018
Stages 4 & 10 Vuelta Ciclista del Uruguay, Héctor Lucero

References

External links

UCI Continental Teams (America)
Cycling teams established in 2010
Cycling teams based in Argentina